Parish of Tongowoko may refer to either of two land parishes of New South Wales:
 Parish of Tongowoko, Delalah County
 Parish of Tongowoko, Tongowoko County

Parishes of Delalah County
Parishes of Tongowoko County